Ruben Bertrand Boumtje-Boumtje (born May 20, 1978) is a Cameroonian professional basketball executive and former player who last served as the assistant general manager of the Delaware Blue Coats of the NBA G League. He played college basketball for the Georgetown Hoyas and professionally in the National Basketball Association (NBA) for the Portland Trail Blazers. Boumtje-Boumtje retired in November 2011 at age 33 due to a heart condition.

High school and college career
Boumtje-Boumtje attended Archbishop Carroll High School in Washington, D.C. for one year. He played college basketball at Georgetown University and holds career averages of 9.6 points and 6.8 rebounds per game. He ranks fourth on the Hoyas' all-time blocked shots list with 255, behind Patrick Ewing, Alonzo Mourning and Dikembe Mutombo.

Professional career

NBA
Boumtje-Boumtje was selected in the 2001 NBA Draft by the Portland Trail Blazers with the 50th overall pick and participated in 44 games over three seasons from 2001 to 2004. What ended up being his final regular season NBA game took place on December 20, 2003 while the Blazers visited the San Antonio Spurs in a losing effort; Boumtje-Boumtje recorded one foul and one missed field goal in four minutes of playing time. On January 21, 2004, when he was traded along with guard Jeff McInnis to the Cleveland Cavaliers in exchange for small forward Darius Miles.

He was waived soon afterwards, having never played a game for them. In July 2005, Boumtje-Boumtje was drafted in the 2005 AAPBL Draft but the league folded before a game was even played.  On August 22, 2005, it was announced the Orlando Magic had signed him to a contract of undisclosed terms. He had played five games with them during the 2005 Reebok Vegas Summer League while averaging 4.8 points, shooting 56.3 percent of his field goals (9-of-16), and 3.6 rebounds in 16.8 minutes per game.

European leagues
Boumtje-Boumtje played the 2006–07 season for Alba Berlin in the ULEB Cup and the German Basketball Bundesliga. After the season, his contract was not renewed, but he joined league rival EWE Baskets Oldenburg in November as a replacement for injured Dan McClintock and later signed for the remainder of the 2007–08 season. Oldenburg renewed his contract for the 2008–09 season. The team became the German league champions in June 2009.

In 2010 Boumtje-Boumtje joined the Artland Dragons in Germany. In 2011, he signed with Bayern Munich, but he immediately retired after just 4 games, because of an irregularity with his heart.

Off-the-court
Boumtje-Boumtje speaks three languages - a native Cameroonian language, French and English. At Georgetown he was a pre-med, as well as a mathematics and biology double major.  He was named Big East Scholar-Athlete of the Year in 2001, an honor often reserved for athletes in non-televised sports, and used the occasion to restate his intention to attend medical school if he were not drafted by the NBA. In 2014, Ruben earned a master's degree in Applied Mathematics and Statistics from Georgetown University.
He recently interned at Elder Research.

After his playing career, he joined the Philadelphia 76ers’ staff as a technical scout. In 2019, he was hired as the assistant general manager of the Delaware Blue Coats of the NBA G League. In June 2020, he was let go from the 76ers organization after his contract was not renewed.

NBA career statistics

Regular season 

|-
| align="left" | 
| align="left" | Portland
| 33  || 1 || 7.4 || .406 || – || .520 || 1.7 || .1 || .1 || .5 || 1.2
|-
| align="left" | 
| align="left" | Portland
| 2  || 0 || 2.5 || .000 || – || – || .5 || .5 || .5 || .0 || .0
|-
| align="left" | 
| align="left" | Portland
| 9  || 0 || 2.9 || .200 || – || 1.000 || .1 || .1 || .0 || .1 || .4
|-
| style="text-align:left;"| Career
| style="text-align:left;"|
| 44 || 1 || 6.3 || .368 || – || .556 || 1.3 || .1 || .1 || .4 || 1.0

References

External links
Boumtje-Boumtje at NBA.com
Player Profile at HoopsHype.com
Basketpedya.com Player Profile

1978 births
Living people
Alba Berlin players
Artland Dragons players
Cameroonian expatriate basketball people in Germany
Cameroonian expatriate basketball people in Greece
Cameroonian expatriate basketball people in the United States
Cameroonian men's basketball players
Centers (basketball)
EWE Baskets Oldenburg players
FC Bayern Munich basketball players
Fayetteville Patriots players
Georgetown Hoyas men's basketball players
Greek Basket League players
National Basketball Association players from Cameroon
Panellinios B.C. players
Portland Trail Blazers draft picks
Portland Trail Blazers players
People from Littoral Region (Cameroon)
Archbishop Carroll High School (Washington, D.C.) alumni